The Copyright Agency of Azerbaijan Republic is a governmental agency within the Cabinet of Azerbaijan in charge of regulation of activities related to protection of copyrights and intellectual property in Azerbaijan Republic. The committee is headed by Kamran Imanov.

History and structure
The Copyright Agency was established by the Presidential Decree on September 10, 1993.
The main functions of the agency are creation of favorable legal conditions for potential people seeking to make contributions to scientific research in the country, literature and art; protection of copyright, related to the intellectual property and conducting state policy in field of the international cultural exchange; representation of Azerbaijan in international events, encouraging cooperation with similar agencies abroad; state registration of scientific, cultural and art works, etc. Azerbaijan enacted Law on Copyright and Related Rights in 1996.

Azerbaijan is a member of World Intellectual Property Organization (WIPO), a party to the Convention Establishing the World Intellectual Property Organization, the Paris Convention for Protection of Industrial Property, the Berne Convention for the Protection of Literary and Artistic Works, and the Geneva Phonograms Convention.

The agency was given the duty of protecting the folklore of Azerbaijan by President Ilham Aliyev.

In 2017 the head of agency stated that compared to 2005 figures, internet piracy level reduced from 61% to 29%.

All registered intellectual property can be found in the registry of the company. Nowadays 11.500 items were registered as intellectual property.

Activity of Agency 
Core article:Intellectual Property Law in Azerbaijan

The activity of agency is strictly consistent with the Constitution of Azerbaijan, orders of President and cabinet of Ministers of Azerbaijan Republic, duties derived from international agreement in terms of copyright security and intellectual property.

Aims of agency:

  Make a foundation to motivate creations in art, science, literature spheres
  Secure of copyright, intellectual property laws
  Ensure the state policy in terms of cultural exchange at the international level

Duties of Agency 

 Ensure that government's policy for copyright laws are conducted
 Making the proposals for copyright laws’ improvements and presentation of proposals for consideration in appropriate government entities
 Controlling the obedience of existing copyright laws
 Representing Azerbaijan in international organizations in the copyright security sphere
 Ensuring the state registration of scientific, art, cultural works
 Implementation of state policy and guidance in the field of protection of topology's internal circuits
 Making the proposals for topology's internal circuit's improvements and presentation of proposals for consideration in appropriate government entities
 Representing Azerbaijan in international organizations in topology circuit's security sphere
 Governmental registration of all topology circuits
 Governmental copyright protection of cultural, folklore citations and aphorisms
 Making the proposals for folklore/cultural copyright laws’ improvements and presentation of proposals for consideration in appropriate government entities
 Representing the Azerbaijan Republic on the international level in folklore copyright security organizations
 Protection and representation of national interests in case of violation of folklore copyright laws
 Governmental registration of copyright law's transfer agreement
 Registration of databases which are protected by copyright laws and other types of securities
 Representing Azerbaijan in international organizations in the database security sphere
 Implementation of state policy and guidance in the field of protection of databases

Authority of agency 

 Making the proposals for copyright laws’ improvements and presentation of proposals for consideration in appropriate government entities
 Represent the Minister's Cabinet in official statements linked to copyright security
 Giving the binding orders, explanations to relevant entities linked to copyright security
 Monitor governmental statements in the copyright security sphere
 Demand the suspension of illegal activity endangering the intellectual/copyright property
 Demand the inspection of required documents which indicates possession of the intellectual property
 Take a specimen of material carriers for the purpose of Its legal release for the final consumers
 In the case of copyright law's violation demand the elimination of distribution of illegal instances (copies) of the product
 Demand the list of actions that are intended to secure the illegal distribution from the intellectual property owner
 According to regulatory documents to raise claims in courts in order to apply economic sanctions
 Resolve the disagreements and manage the ownership rights between the authors and holders of related rights
 Give licenses to organizations and physical entities for relevant purposes, determine the size of the fee, rules of issuing the fee, revoke the license if the current agreement is violated
 Engage in informational, advertising and print activities in Azerbaijan and foreign countries, establish the mass media.

Organizational structure 
Structure of the agency consists of 4 departments. The head of the Agency is a chairman who is personally carrying the responsibility for duties which are linked to his span of duties. Agency is financed by the government.

See also
Intellectual Property Law in Azerbaijan
Cabinet of Azerbaijan
 List of Azerbaijan legislation

References

Government agencies of Azerbaijan
Government agencies established in 1993
Azerbaijan copyright law
Copyright agencies